Puente Celeste is an Argentine music group, founded in 1997. They won a Clarín Award for the best musical album in 1997, as well as a Konex Award (Diploma of Merit, in the nomination of jazz music) in 2005.

They perform a broad range of music which is influenced by jazz, tango, as well as Latin American folk music and even Klezmer.

Band members
 Edgardo Cardozo (guitar, vocals)
 Luciano Dyzenchauz (double bass)
 Marcelo Moguilevsky (wind instruments, vocals)
 Lucas Nikotián (accordion, piano)
 Santiago Vazquez (percussion, vocals)

Discography
 Santiago Vazquez & Puente Celeste (1997), Clarín Award for the best musical album and Revelation of the year
 Pasando el mar (2002)
 Mañana domingo (2004)
 Canciones (2009)
 Puente Celeste en vivo en Café Vinilo (2011)

References

Argentine jazz ensembles
Musical groups established in 1997